Pteroceras is a genus of flowering plants from the orchid family, Orchidaceae. It is native to China, the Indian Subcontinent, and Southeast Asia.

Accepted Species
Species accepted as of May 2022:

Pteroceras asperatum (Schltr.) P.F.Hunt - Yunnan
Pteroceras biserratum (Ridl.) Holttum - Borneo, Malaysia, Sumatra
Pteroceras compressum (Blume) Holttum - Malaysia, Sumatra, Java, Thailand
Pteroceras dalaputtuwa Priyadarshana et al. - Sri Lanka
Pteroceras erosulum H.A.Pedersen - Sabah
Pteroceras fragrans (Ridl.) Garay - Borneo
Pteroceras fraternum (J.J.Sm.) Bakh.f. - Sumatra, Java
Pteroceras hirsutum (Hook.f.) Holttum - Borneo, Malaysia, Sumatra
Pteroceras indicum Punekar - Karnataka
Pteroceras johorense (Holttum) Holttum - Johor
Pteroceras leopardinum (C.S.P.Parish & Rchb.f.) Seidenf. & Smitinand - Yunnan, India, Indochina, Borneo, Philippines, Sumatra
Pteroceras longicalcareum (Ames & Rolfe) Garay - Philippines
Pteroceras monsooniae Sasidh. & Sujanapal - Kerala
Pteroceras muluense Schuit. & de Vogel - Sabah, Sarawak
Pteroceras muriculatum (Rchb.f.) P.F.Hunt - Andaman Islands
Pteroceras nabawanense J.J.Wood & A.L.Lamb - Sabah
Pteroceras philippinense (Ames) Garay - Philippines
Pteroceras spathibrachiatum (J.J.Sm.) Garay - Sabah
Pteroceras teres (Blume) Holttum - Assam, Nepal, Bhutan, India, Bangladesh, Indochina, Malaysia, Indonesia, Philippines 
Pteroceras violaceum (Ridl.) Holttum - Pahang
Pteroceras viridiflorum (Thwaites) Holttum - India, Sri Lanka
Pteroceras vriesii (Ridl.) Garay - Borneo

Formerly included species
Many recently excluded species have been transferred to the genus Brachypeza. One recent transfer has been made to the genus Grosourdya.
Pteroceras cladostachyum (Hook.f.) H.A.Pedersen of Borneo, Malaysia, Java, Sulawesi and the Philippines is now a synonym of Brachypeza cladostachya (Hook.f.) Kocyan & Schuit.
Pteroceras decipiens (J.J.Sm.) Bakh.f. of Java and Bali is now a synonym of Grosourdya decipiens (J.J.Sm.) Kocyan & Schuit.
Pteroceras pallidum (Blume) Holttum of Thailand, Vietnam, Malaysia, Indonesia and the Philippines is now a synonym of Brachypeza pallida (Blume) Kocyan & Schuit.
Pteroceras semiteretifolium H.A.Pedersen of Vietnam is now a synonym of Brachypeza semiteretifolia (H.A.Pedersen) Kocyan & Schuit.
Pteroceras simondianum (Gagnep.) Aver. of Vietnam is now a synonym of Brachypeza simondiana (Gagnep.) Kocyan & Schuit.
Pteroceras unguiculatum (Lindl.) H.A.Pedersen of the Andaman & Nicobar Islands, Malaysia, Indonesia and the Philippines is now a synonym of Brachypeza unguiculata (Lindl.) Kocyan & Schuit.

See also
 List of Orchidaceae genera

References

External links

Orchids of Asia
Vandeae genera
Aeridinae